Nikola Aksentijević (born 9 March 1993) is a Serbian professional footballer who plays as a defender for Radnički Niš.

Club career
Aksentijević started playing football with hometown club Radnički Kragujevac. He later joined the youth academy of Partizan in 2006. In October 2010, due to absence of numerous national team players, Aksentijević was one of five juniors who were invited to the first team for a rescheduled cup match against Mladost Apatin. He made his debut for the club as a substitute in that match, on 6 October 2010, which Partizan won 6–0.

In the 2011 winter transfer window, Aksentijević was loaned to Teleoptik. He made 10 league appearances until the end of the 2010–11 season. Originally a defensive midfielder, Aksentijević was converted into a right-back by Teleoptik manager Vuk Rašović during this period.

On 6 July 2011, Aksentijević signed his first professional contract with Partizan, on a five-year deal. He scored a long-range goal on his league debut against Sloboda Užice on 21 August 2011. However, Partizan lost the match 2–1.

On 31 August 2012, Aksentijević was officially transferred to Dutch side Vitesse. He failed to make his competitive debut for the club, playing exclusively for Vitesse's U21 team during the 2012–13 season.

On 20 June 2013, Aksentijević returned to Partizan on a season-long loan. He subsequently spent one season at OFK Beograd and one season at Mouscron-Péruwelz.

On 8 September 2016, Aksentijević was officially presented at Vojvodina.

International career
Aksentijević represented Serbia at under-17, under-19 and under-21 level. He made his full international debut for Serbia on 14 November 2017, coming on as an injury-time substitute for Antonio Rukavina in a 1–1 friendly draw against South Korea in Ulsan.

Career statistics

Club

International

Honours
Partizan
 Serbian SuperLiga: 2011–12

References

External links
 
 
 
 

Association football defenders
Belgian Pro League players
Expatriate footballers in Belgium
Expatriate footballers in the Netherlands
FK Napredak Kruševac players
FK Partizan players
FK Radnički Niš players
FK Teleoptik players
FK Vojvodina players
OFK Beograd players
Royal Excel Mouscron players
SBV Vitesse players
Serbia international footballers
Serbia under-21 international footballers
Serbian expatriate footballers
Serbian expatriate sportspeople in Belgium
Serbian expatriate sportspeople in the Netherlands
Serbian First League players
Serbian footballers
Serbian SuperLiga players
Sportspeople from Kragujevac
1993 births
Living people